General Sir Collingwood Dickson  (20 November 1817 – 28 November 1904) was a senior British Army officer and a recipient of the Victoria Cross, the highest award for gallantry in the face of the enemy that can be awarded to British and Commonwealth forces.

Early life and career
Collingwood Dickson was a son of Major General Sir Alexander Dickson, a Royal Artillery officer. He was educated at the Royal Military Academy, Woolwich, and followed his father into the Royal Artillery in 1835. He served in the First Carlist War, in which the United Kingdom supported Queen Isabella II. After that war, Queen Isabella awarded him three Spanish decorations: the Order of Charles III, the Royal and Military Order of San Fernando and the Order of Isabella the Catholic.

Victoria Cross action
At the siege of Sebastopol during the Crimean War, Dickson was a lieutenant colonel on the staff of Lord Raglan. Following an incident during the siege, Dickson was awarded the VC:

Dickson was appointed a Companion of the Order of the Bath in 1855, and in 1856, along with many other British soldiers, he was appointed Chevalier of the French Legion of Honour; shortly before the publication of his VC award in 1857 he was promoted to the next higher rank of the Legion, Officier.

Later life
From September 1855 till the end of the Crimean War Dickson was employed with the Turkish contingent, and the Sultan awarded him the Order of the Medjidie (third class).

Later in his army service Dickson was Inspector-General of Artillery 1870–75. He was made Colonel commandant of the Royal Artillery in 1875, and was promoted to full general in 1877. He officially retired in 1884, but remained Colonel Commandant until his death in 1904. He is buried at Kensal Green Cemetery; his Victoria Cross and his many other medals are on display at the Royal Artillery Museum.

References

Footnotes

Bibliography
DICKSON, Gen. Sir Collingwood, Who Was Who, A & C Black, 1920–2016 (online edition, Oxford University Press, 2014)
Obituary, The Times, London, 30 November 1904, page 6

1817 births
1904 deaths
Graduates of the Royal Military Academy, Woolwich
Royal Artillery officers
British Army personnel of the Crimean War
Crimean War recipients of the Victoria Cross
British Army recipients of the Victoria Cross
British Army generals
Knights Grand Cross of the Order of the Bath
Officiers of the Légion d'honneur
Recipients of the Order of Isabella the Catholic
Recipients of the Order of the Medjidie, 3rd class
Burials at Kensal Green Cemetery